Osian's-Connoisseurs of Art Private Limited was a fund started in Mumbai in 2007 by Neville Tuli. It was closed down in 2010 upon orders from the Securities and Exchange Board of India, SEBIname="forbes"></ref>

Founding
Osian's art fund was India's first arts based fund. It was established in 2007 in Mumbai by Neville Tuli, an Indian who had reportedly spent eight years gambling in the UK (mostly on horses at Ladbrokes)and had returned to India in the early 2000s. The fund consisted of numerous schemes, which allowed people to invest a minimum of Rs 10 lakh and in multiples of Rs 5 lakh thereafter, promising annual returns of 10 percent. The fund in turn invested in art by Indian painters. The fund was not registered with SEBI. A similar fund floated by another company called "Yatra Art fund" also used a similar modus operandi. It too was finally closed down by SEBI in 2015.

Modus Operandi
The fund invested funds in art, including paintings, and had a functioning art auction house. As per Forbes and Moneylife India, Tuli built up a clientele in the nascent art scene in India, by attending socialite parties and get togethers, portraying himself to be an expert on art, writing books and subsequently floating an art fund that would invest in art. Investments in this art fund were sold through a tie up with the Indian division of ABN Amro, a Dutch bank. A high entry load was charged to all investors,  and this was used for a while to pay them back. Subsequently, the fund ran out of money and after complaints were lodged by customers, it was investigated by the enforcement directorate in India.

Osian's most popular fund offered was the "Osian’s Art Fund – Scheme Contemporary 1", a three-year scheme which matured in July 2009 and had 656 unit holders. Returns of up to 40 percent were promised to investors. The company in turn purchased art by Indian artists including MF Husain and FN Souza, but was only able to sell them at a loss, thus leaving its investors with their initial investments eroded.

As per an investigation co0nducted by SEBI, the scheme had thus collected 102.4 crore rupees. A fund management fee of 3% was charged for purchasing units of Rs. 100 each, with an agreement to share the profits of sales with customers on a 30:70 basis and a promised hurdle rate of 15 percent.

Closure
Following complaints of non payment, the SAT (Securities Appellate Tribunal) ordered an investigation into the schemes floated by Osian. After hearing the case for over five years, it finally decided in April 2013 that the schemes floated by Osian were illegal 'Collective Investment Schemes', all carried out under the umbrella of "Osian's Connoisseurs", a sponsor and asset management company for Osian Art Fund. Thus they came under the gambit of SEBI and needed to be both registered as well as needed to comply with SEBI guidelines.

Connosiers of Art pvt. ltd., the holding company of Osian's art fund was finally ordered to be closed in 2013 by the Securities and exchange board of India. Most of its customers did not receive their principal back. Its outstandings were to the tune of Rs. 40 crores in 2014. No charges were levied against the founder Tuli who continues to operate Osian from New Delhi under a revised banner. In 2014, Tuli appealed to a tribunal to allow Osian to continue, while he tried to pay back at least some of its customers. In April 2017, the art fund was formally closed down, though Osian continues to work in other fields including wildlife.

Meanwhile, Abraaj Capital, a Dubai-based investment company filed a suit in London's commercial court against Osian to recover the $23.7 million it gave Bregawn Jersey, one of Tuli's many offshore companies, to seed an international venture called the India Asia Arab Art Fund. Osian's most ambitious project, Osianama, an art conservatory and pop culture museum, is yet to rise from the land in Central Mumbai where the famed Minerva theatre once stood.

As per Forbes, the list of people who invested in Osian's art funds including the "Connoisseurs of Art" fund includes Sanjeev Khandelwal (Khandelwal Laboratories), industrialist Gautam Thapar, Pramit Jhaveri (Citibank), Sheshasayee Properties (Kumar Mangalam Birla), Priya Paul (Apeejay Surendra Group), HCL Corporation Ltd., Roshni Nadar, Ashok Alexander (Gates Foundation), celebrity cook Tarla Dalal, Jaithirth (Jerry) Rao (the founder of MphasiS), Kamal Morarka (Gannon Dunkerly) and Sangita Kathiwada.

References

Investment companies of India